Danmark may refer to:
The Danish, Norwegian and Swedish name for the country of Denmark, see Etymology of Denmark
The minor locality of Danmark in Uppsala Municipality, Sweden

Danmark is also a common ship's name:

Danish ironclad Danmark, an armoured frigate, 1864-1900
Danmark (1906), a three-masted bark used on the Danmark Expedition 1906-1908
Danmark (ship), a full-rigged training ship, 1932-present

See also
Denmark (disambiguation)